Gilles was an electoral district of the House of Assembly in the Australian state of South Australia from 1970 to 1993.

In 1977, the polling places were: Greenacres, Hillcrest, Klemzig, Manningham, Marden, Paradise West, Vale Park, Windsor Gardens and Windsor Grove.

Gilles was the Dunstan Labor government's most and only marginal seat following the 1973 election, and the Dunstan Labor government's most marginal seat following the 1975 election. Gilles was abolished in a boundary redistribution at the 1993 election. The re-created seat of Torrens absorbed much of the seat, remaining a marginal Liberal seat.

Members

Election results

References

External links
1985 & 1989 election boundaries, page 18 & 19

Former electoral districts of South Australia
1970 establishments in Australia
1993 disestablishments in Australia
Constituencies established in 1970
Constituencies disestablished in 1993